Ferdinando Piretti (17th century – 18th century) was an Italian mathematician. He lived at the San Vitale monastery in Ravenna and later at the San Benedetto monastery in Ferrara.

Works

References 

18th-century Italian mathematicians
Italian mathematicians